Ryan James may refer to:

 Ryan James (rugby league) (born 1991), Australian rugby league footballer
 Ryan James (actor) (born 1975), American screenwriter, actor and voice over artist
 Ryan James (soccer) (born 1994), Canadian soccer player
 Ryan James (rugby union) (born 1999), American rugby union player